Tommy Glynn is a former Gaelic football and hurling player from County Wicklow in Ireland. He played hurling with Wicklow for 16 years and also played with the football team. He won an All Ireland Junior medal with Wicklow in 1969 when they beat Kerry in the final. His sons Leighton and Enan have both played and captained Wicklow football and hurling teams.

References
http://www.irishtimes.com/newspaper/sport/2012/0526/1224316731887.html

Year of birth missing (living people)
Living people
Dual players
Wicklow inter-county Gaelic footballers
Wicklow inter-county hurlers
Rathnew Gaelic footballers
Glenealy hurlers